The following is a list of productions by American Hip hop producer/rapper Black Milk.

Production

2002
Various Artists - Slum Village Presents: Dirty District

08. Elzhi - "Freestyle"
09. Black Milk - "Freestyle"
10. Ten Speed - "Real Life" (featuring Brown Shoe)

Slum Village - Trinity (Past, Present and Future)

04. "What Is This"
09. "Trinity (Interlude)"

2003
Various Artists - Duck Down - Collect Dis Edition

06. Starang Wondah - "That's What's Up"

Phat Kat - The Undeniable LP

02. "Door (featuring J Dilla and Fat Ray) (Produced by Black Milk)

2004
B.R. Gunna - Dirty District Vol. 2

01. "Intro" (Produced by B.R. Gunna)
02. "Do Ya Thang" (featuring J Dilla) (Produced by B.R. Gunna)
03. "Don't Hang Up" (Produced by B.R. Gunna)
04. "Jackin'" (featuring Que D and Samiyyah Dixon) (Produced by B.R. Gunna)
05. "Motor Boyz" (featuring Marv One and Young Miles) (Produced by B.R. Gunna)
06. "Number 1" (featuring King Arubis) (Produced by B.R. Gunna)
07. "Dat's Fa Sho" (featuring MC Breed) (Produced by B.R. Gunna)
08. "Gunna" (featuring Elzhi) (Produced by B.R. Gunna)
09. "Man Up" (featuring Fat Ray, Qwest M.C.O.D.Y., Villen, and Black Milk) (Produced by B.R. Gunna)
10. "Get Dat Dough" (featuring Young RJ) (Produced by B.R. Gunna)
11. "Alert" (featuring Guilty Simpson) (Produced by B.R. Gunna)
12. "MU Freestyle" (featuring MU) (Produced by B.R. Gunna)
13. "Stupid" (featuring J Dilla) (Produced by B.R. Gunna)
14. "True Story" (featuring Phat Kat) (Produced by B.R. Gunna)
15. "Somethin' Good" (featuring Dramatics) (Produced by B.R. Gunna)
16. "Hip Hop" (featuring Finale, Invincible and AHK) (Produced by B.R. Gunna)
17. "Stixs" (Produced by B.R. Gunna)
18. "Outro" (Produced by B.R. Gunna)

Slum Village - Detroit Deli (A Taste of Detroit)

01. "Zoom" (featuring Phat Kat) (Produced by B.R. Gunna)
03. "Dirty" (featuring Dirt McGirt) (Produced by B.R. Gunna)
04. "Late 80's" (Skit) (Produced by B.R. Gunna)
08. "Keep Holding On" (featuring Melanie Rutherford) (Produced by B.R. Gunna)
09. "It's On" (featuring MC Breed and Big Herk) (Produced by B.R. Gunna)
10. "The Hours" (Produced by B.R. Gunna)
11. "Things We Do" (Produced by B.R. Gunna)
13. "Reunion" (featuring J Dilla) (Produced by B.R. Gunna)

Elzhi - Witness My Growth: The Mixtape 97-04

16. "Are U Ready (Gunna)"
18. "No Need For Alarm" (featuring Yakknus)
21. "Say How I Feel" (Slum Village Remix) (Rhian Benson featuring Slum Village and Dwele) (Produced by B.R. Gunna)

2005
Canibus - Hip-Hop for Sale

08. "Da Facelift"

Fat Killahz - Guess Who's Coming to Dinner?

02. "Get Ya' Paper" (Produced by B.R. Gunna)

Invincible - Last Warning: Bootleg Mixtape

07. "Last Warning" (featuring Finale) (Produced by B.R. Gunna)

Black Milk - Sound of the City, Vol. 1

01. "Intro"
02. "Nigga What"
03. "Danger" (featuring T3 and Phat Kat)
04. "Pimp Cup"
05. "Duck"
06. "So Gone"
07. "This That" (featuring Marv Won)
08. "Dirty Horns" (Instrumental)
09. "Bang Dis Shit" (featuring Nametag)
10. "Swing Dat Far"
11. "Sound of the City" (featuring Fat Ray and Elzhi)
12. "Dirty Guitar" (Instrumental)
13. "Eternal" (featuring Baatin)
14. "Applause"
15. "Holla Like You Know Me" (featuring Que Diesel)
16. "Outro"
17. "Hidden Track"

Slum Village - Slum Village

02. "Set It"
03. "Can I" (Produced by B.R. Gunna)
04. "Call Me" (Produced by B.R. Gunna)
07. "Multiply" (Produced by B.R. Gunna)
09. "Hear This" (featuring Phat Kat and Black Milk)
11. "Hell Naw!" (featuring Black Milk and Que D)
12. "Ez Up" (featuring J Isaac) (Produced by B.R. Gunna)

Proof - Searching for Jerry Garcia

06. "Purple Gang" (featuring Killa Kaunn, T-Flame and Young Famous) (Produced by B.R. Gunna)
08. "Gurls Wit Da Boom" (Produced by B.R. Gunna)

2006
Black Milk - Broken Wax EP

01. "Broken Wax"
02. "Pressure"
03. "Keep It Live" (featuring Mr. Porter)
04. "U's A Freak Bitch"
05. "Tell 'Em" (featuring Nametag)
06. "Danger" (featuring T3 and Phat Kat)
07. "S.O.T.C." (featuring Fat Ray and Elzhi)
08. "Outro"

T3 - Olio: The Mixtape

03. "Xtra" (featuring Fat Ray)
04. "Heartbreaker" (featuring Guilty Simpson)
05. "Ain't Gon't Stop Me"
06. "Liar"
07. "Talk 2 Me Later"
08. "Interlude"
09. "Ooh No" (featuring Que D)
10. "Open"
11. "Detroit" (featuring Mu)
12. "You Don't Have 2 B"
13. "Paper 2"
14. "Nobody" (featuring Big Tone and MonicaBlaire)
15. "Yawl" (featuring Black Milk and Elzhi)
16. "When You Grow Up"
17. "Listen" (featuring Que D)
18. "Interlude"
19. "I See You"
20. "Yeah"
21. "Yes, Yes, Yes" (featuring Black Milk)
22. "Outro"

Phat Kat - Quiet Bubble: The Mixtape

02. "Door" (featuring Black Milk and J Dilla) (Produced by B.R. Gunna)
03. "Polo Shit" (featuring Fat Ray) (Produced by B.R. Gunna)
07. "True Story" (Produced by B.R. Gunna)
15. "Danger" (Black Milk featuring Phat Kat and T3)
16. "Cash 'Em Out" (featuring Lo Louis)

Lloyd Banks - Rotten Apple

00. "Death Wish" (Fat Joe & The LOX Diss) (Leftover)

2007
WildChild - Jack Of All Trades

08. "Ox To Tha D" (featuring Frank N Dank)
11. "Interviews"
13. "Love At 1st Mic"

NameTag - Ahead Of The Basics

01. "The Intro"
02. "Ahead Of The Basics"
04. "Tell 'Em" (featuring Black Milk)
06. "So Raw"
07. "About You"
09. "Action Pack" (featuring B. Stromz, BroadCast and OnPoint)
10. "Anotha Club Hit"
16. "Momentum Music"
17. "Countdown"

Black Milk - Popular Demand

01. "Popular Demand"
02. "Sound the Alarm" (featuring Guilty Simpson)
03. "Insane"
04. "Lookatusnow" (featuring Phat Kat)
05. "U" (featuring Ty and Kory)
06. "Shut It Down" (featuring AHK)
07. "So Gone"
08. "Say Something" (featuring Nametag and Slim S.D.H.)
09. "Play the Keys"
10. "Watch 'Em" (featuring Fat Ray and Que D)
11. "Three+Sum" (featuring Lil' Skeeter)
12. "Action" (featuring Slum Village and Baatin)
13. "Luvin' It"
14. "One Song"
15. "I'm Out"
16. "Take It There" (Bonus Track) (featuring One Be Lo)

Now On - Don't Call It A Mixtape

02. "The Now On Show"
12. "Up At It Again (Black Milk Remix)"

Pharoahe Monch - Desire

08. "Let's Go" (featuring MeLa Machinko)
10. "Bar Tap" (featuring MeLa Machinko)

Skyzoo - Corner Store Classic (Mixtape)

06. "Hold Tight"
10. "Play Your Position" (featuring Guilty Simpson)

Phat Kat - Carte Blanche

05. "Danger" (featuring T3 and Black Milk)
08. "Cash Em Out" (featuring Loe Louis)
10. "Survival Kit"
12. "Hard Enuff" (featuring Fat Ray)

Taje - Hot Box: The Second Hit
   	
12. "Win Or Lose" (featuring Mopreme Shakur)

Strange Fruit Project - The Lost Documents Volume 1

01. " The Feeling"

Baatin - Marvelous Magic
01. "Marvelous"
02. "Magic"

Bishop Lamont & Black Milk - Caltroit

02. "Caltroit" (featuring Indef and Chevy Jones)
06. "Goatit" (featuring Phat Kat and Elzhi)
07. "Go Hard" (featuring Ras Kass and Royce Da 5'9")
08. "Mouth Music" (featuring Guilty Simpson and Busta Rhymes)
12. "Bang That Shit Out" (featuring Diverse)
14. "Ape Shit"
15. "Everything" (featuring Kardinal Offishall and Trek Life)
17. "Get 'Em" (featuring Trick Trick, Marv One and Fattfather)
18. "Spectacular" (featuring Illa J, Frank Nitty and Busta Rhymes)

2008
Torae - Daily Conversation

08. "Switch"

Guilty Simpson - Ode to the Ghetto

11. "Run" (featuring Black Milk and Sean Price)
14. "The Real Me"

Skyzoo - Corner Store Classic (The Remixes)

06. "Hold Tight (Remix)" (featuring Black Milk)

Fat Ray & Black Milk - The Set Up

01. "Flawless"
02. "Lookout" (featuring NameTag)
03. "Bad Man" (featuring Guilty Simpson and Scorpion)
04. "Take Control" (featuring AB)
05. "Not U"
06. "When It Goes Down"
07. "Get Focus" (featuring Phat Kat and Elzhi)
08. "Nothing To Hide"
09. "Get Up" (Bonus)
10. "Ugly"
11. "Outro"

Kidz in the Hall - The In Crowd

09. "Middle Of The Map Pt. 1" (featuring Fooch)

Buff1 - There's Only One

10. "Never Fall" (featuring Black Milk)

Elzhi - The Preface

01. "Intro (The Preface)"
02. "The Leak" (featuring Ayah)
03. "Guessing Game"
04. "Motown 25" (featuring Royce da 5'9")	
05. "Brag Swag"
06. "Colors"  	
07. "Fire (Remix)" (featuring Black Milk, Guilty Simpson, Fatt Father, Danny Brown and Fat Ray)
08. "D.E.M.O.N.S."
10. "Yeah" (featuring Phat Kat)	
11. "Transitional Joint"
12. "Talking In My Sleep"
14. "Hands Up" 	
15. "What I Write"
16. "Growing Up" (featuring AB)

Invincible - ShapeShifters

01. "State Of Emergency (Intro)"
08. "Recognize" (featuring Finale)

GZA/Genius - Pro Tools

05. "7 Pounds" *

* The intro of "7 Pounds" is produced by Preservation.

Brooklyn Academy - Bored Of Education

16. What's The Buzz (featuring Will Tell)

DJ K.O. - Picture This...

12. Skyzoo, Emilio Rojas and Median  - "Start It All Over"

Colin Munroe - Is The Unsung Hero (Mixtape)

02. "Piano Lessons" (featuring Joell Ortiz)

Pumpkinhead - Picture That (The Negative)

15. "Fiyakrakaz"

Black Milk - Tronic

01. "Long Story Short"
02. "Bounce"
03. "Give the Drummer Sum"
04. "Without U/Electric Ribbon (Interlude)" (featuring Colin Munroe) *
05. "Hold It Down"
06. "Losing Out" (featuring Royce Da 5'9")
07. "Hell Yeah" (featuring Fat Ray)
08. "Overdose"
09. "Reppin For U" (featuring AB)
10. "The Matrix" (featuring Pharoahe Monch, Sean Price and DJ Premier)
11. "Try"
12. "Tronic Summer"
13. "Bond 4 Life (Music)" (featuring Melanie Rutherford)
14. "Elec (Outro)"

* "Without U" is not produced by Black Milk; at the end of the track, the interlude "Electric Ribbon" is produced by Black Milk.

Fatt Father - Fatt Father
02. "Lets Go" 
08. "Heroes" (featuring The Fat Killahz)
12. "Success" featuring Phat Kat & Guilty Simpson)

Ruste Juxx - Sean Price Presents: Indestructible

01. "Wipe Off Ya Smile" (featuring Blaze)
10. "Duck Down!"

NameTag - Classic Cadence, Vol. 1 (Mixtape)

04. "Stylin On 'Em"
07. "Pipe Down"
10. "Bang Dis Shit" (featuring Black Milk)
13. "The Lookout" (featuring Black Milk and Fat Ray)
15. "Say Somethin'" (featuring Black Milk and Slim S.D.H)
16. "Red Alert"

Various Artists - SomeOthaShip: Connect Game EP

03. G&D - "Shine On"
09. G&D - "Shine On" (Bonus Instrumental)

2009

Blame One - Days Chasing Days

02. "Perseverance"

NameTag - Classic Cadence, Vol. 2 (Mixtape)

02. "Back On My Shit" (featuring Skyzoo)
04. "Stylin On 'Em"
16. "Courtesy Of Ambition"

Finale - A Pipe Dream And A Promise

05. "One Man Show" (Scratches by DJ Presyce)
08. "Motor Music"

Ivan Ives - Newspeak

08. "Aeonian Anthem"

Miles Jones - Runaway Jones (August 18, 2009)

02. "Never To Late"

Various Artists - The Budget Is Low Mixtape Vol. 1

05. Kenn Starr - "Say Goodbye"

KRS-One & Buckshot - Survival Skills

03. "The Way I Live" (featuring Mary J. Blige)
07. "Runnin' Away" (featuring Immortal Technique)

Skyzoo - The Salvation

09. "Penmanship"

Elzhi - The Leftovers Unmixedtape

02. "Deep"
04. "Like This"
05. "Red, Black And Green"
13. "5 Man Hustle"

Bishop Lamont & Indef - Team America: F*ck Yeah (Mixtape)

07. "Money On My Head"

MarvWon - Way Of The Won

11. "Talk About"

2010
Rapper Big Pooh - The Purple Tape (Mixtape)

01. "When I’m Done"
02. "Blueprint"
03. "Impatient" (featuring Ms. Cris)
04. "Put It In The Air" (featuring Joe Scudda)
05. "Holding Back" (featuring Erica Thompson)
06. "Girlfriend"
07. "Camera Tricks" (featuring Chaundon)
08. "Law & Order" (featuring Jozeemo)
09. "Bounce"
10. "Say Something" (featuring DJ Flash)
11. "Shoutemout"

Nametag - The Name Is Tag

02. "Nowhere But Up"
04. "Another Other"
05. "Celebrate" (featuring Ro Spit)
08. "At It" (featuring Danny Brown)
10. "City Song"

Black Milk - Album of the Year

01. "365"
02. "Welcome (Gotta Go)"
03. "Keep Going"
04. "Oh Girl" (featuring AB)
05. "Deadly Medley" (featuring Royce da 5'9" and Elzhi)
06. "Distortion" (featuring Melanie Rutherford)
07. "Over Again" (featuring Monica Blaire)
08. "Round of Applause"
09. "Black and Brown" (featuring Danny Brown)
10. "Warning (Keep Bouncing)"
11. "Gospel Psychedelic Rock" (featuring Melanie Rutherford and AB)
12. "Closed Chapter" (featuring Mr. Porter)

2011
A.Dd+ - Loosies (October 04, 2011)

"Insomniac Dreaming"
Bilal - Non-album track

"The Dollar (Black Milk Remix)"

Slaughterhouse - Slaughterhouse EP

03. "Everybody Down"

Random Axe - Random Axe (June 14, 2011)

01. "Zoo Drugs"
02. "Random Call"
03. "Black Ops" (featuring Fat Ray)
04. "Chewbacca" (featuring Roc Marciano)
05. "The Hex"
06. "Understand This"
07. "Everybody Nobody Somebody"
08. "Jahphy Joe" (featuring Melanie Rutherford and Danny Brown)
09. "The Karate Kid"
10. "Never Back Down"
11. "Monster Babies"
12. "Shirley C" (featuring Fatt Father)
13. "Another 1" (featuring Rock and Trick-Trick)
14. "4 In The Box"
15. "Outro Smoutro"

Black Milk - Third Man Records Blue Series (co-produced by Jack White) 

01.  "Brain"
02.  "Royal Mega"

Black Milk and Danny Brown - Black and Brown (November 1, 2011)

01.  "Sound Check"
02.  "Wake Up"
03.  "Loosie"
04.  "Zap"
05.  "Jordan VIII"
06.  "Dada"
07.  "WTF"
08.  "LOL"
09.  "Dark Sunshine"
10.  "Black and Brown"

2012
Skyzoo - A Dream Deferred (October 2, 2012)

12. "Steel's Apartment"

2013 

Black Milk - Synth or Soul
 01. "Computer Ugly Ugly"
 02. "When the Sky Falls"
 03. "600"
 04. "Higgs Boson"
 05. "Piano Moog"
 06. "80's TV Show"
 07. "Why Worry"
 08. "Deep Breath Deep Bass"
 09. "Heaven's Cry"
 10. "Wish a N'gga Would"
 11. "10 Luv"
 12. "Drunk Tweets"

Black Milk - No Poison No Paradise
 01. "Interpret Sabotage" (featuring Mel)
 03. "Codes & Cab Fare" (featuring Black Thought)
 04. "Ghetto Demf" (featuring Quelle Chris)
 05. "Sonny Jr. (Dreams)" (featuring Robert Glasper and Dwele)
 06. "Sunday's Best"
 07. "Monday's Worst"
 08. "Perfected on Puritan Ave."
 09. "Dismal"
 10. "Parallels" (featuring Ab)
 11. "X Chords"
 12. "Black Sabbath" (featuring Tone Trezure)
 13. "Money Bags (Paradise)"
 14. "Poison" (Bonus track)

Mel - Burning Stones
 01. "Hello"
 02. "Inner Demons"
 03. "Back At You"
 04. "Ready"

2014 

Black Milk - Glitches in the Break
 01. "There Are Glitches"
 02. "Dirt Bells"
 03. "Ruffin"
 04. "Silence"
 05. "1 for Dam" (featuring Fat Ray)
 06. "G" (featuring Guilty Simpson)
 07. "Cold Day"
 08. "Reagan" (featuring Fat Ray)
 09. "Break"

Skyzoo & Torae - Barrel Brothers
 06. "All In Together" (featuring Sean Price and Guilty Simpson)

Slum Village - Vintage
 02. "We on the Go!!!" (featuring Black Milk and Frank Nitt)

Black Milk - If There's a Hell Below
 01. "Everyday Was" (featuring Mel)
 02. "What It's Worth"
 03. "Leave the Bones Behind" (featuring Blu and Ab)
 04. "Quarter Water" (featuring Pete Rock)
 05. "Hell Below" (featuring Gene Obey)
 06. "Detroit's New Dance Show"
 07. "Story and Her"
 08. "All Mighty"
 09. "Scum" (featuring Random Axe)
 10. "Gold Piece" (featuring Bun B)
 11. "Grey for Summer"
 12. "Up & Out"

2015 

Kenn Starr - Square One
 02. "Say Goodbye"
 05. "The Definition" (featuring Melanie Rutherford)
 13. "Came To Deliver" (featuring Wordsworth and Supastiton)

 Wiki - Lil Me
 19. "Hate is Earned"

2016 

 Reks - The Greatest X
 08. "Liberation"

 Danny Brown - Atrocity Exhibition
 04. "Really Doe" (featuring Kendrick Lamar, Ab-Soul and Earl Sweatshirt)

2018 

Black Milk - Fever
 01. "Unveil" (featuring Sudie)
 02. "But I Can Be" (featuring Aaron “Ab” Abernathy)
 03. "Could It Be"
 04. "2 Would Try" (featuring Dwele)
 05. "Laugh Now Cry Later"
 06. "True Lies"
 07. "Eve"
 08. "Drown"
 09. "Dive"
 10. "Foe Friend"
 11. "Will Remain"
 12. "You Like To Risk It All / Things Will Never Be"

2019 

Black Milk - DiVE EP
 01. "Save Yourself"
 02. "Black NASA" (featuring Sam Austins)
 03. "If U Say" (featuring BJ the Chicago Kid)
 04. "Relate (Want 2 Know)" (featuring MAHD)
 05. "Blame"
 06. "Swimm" (featuring Phil Swish)
 07. "DiVE pt.2"
 08. "Don't Say"
 09. "Out Loud"
 10. "TYME"
 11. "Now Begin"

2020 

 Mick Jenkins - The Circus
 02. "Carefree"

Unsorted
2009
Black Milk - N/A

"Mo Power"
"Dreams"
"In The A.M."
"Set Go"

2010
Black Milk - N/A

"Don Cornelius"
"How Dare You"

References

Production discographies
Discographies of American artists
Hip hop discographies